Luís Pereira (born 1949) is a Brazilian footballer.

Luís Pereira may also refer to:

 Luís Manuel Pereira (born 1981), Portuguese footballer
 Luis Pereira (Panamanian footballer) (born 1996), Panamanian footballer
 Luís Moniz Pereira (born 1947), professor of computer science
 Luís Teotónio Pereira (1895–1990), Portuguese politician and diplomat